Nitovikla is an archaeological site of a fortress located in the Karpas Peninsula. The Swedish Cyprus Expedition investigated the area in 1929, they discovered tombs dating to the Middle Cypriot III (1725-1600 BC) and excavated the fortress. The fortress was built on a hill that overlooked the plateau and it was made with Cyclopean masonry, it had a square shape with towers in three of the corners and flanking the entrance. The fort was used between the Middle Cypriot III and the Late Cypriot I (1725-1450 BC) periods. The excavation was published in 1935.

See also 
 Prehistoric Cyprus

References 

Bronze Age Cyprus
Archaeological sites in Cyprus